Austin Jackson (born August 11, 1999) is an American football offensive tackle for the Miami Dolphins of the National Football League (NFL). He played college football at USC and was drafted by the Dolphins in the first round of the 2020 NFL Draft.

Early life and high school career
Jackson grew up in Phoenix, Arizona and attended North Canyon High School, where he played defensive and offensive line on the school's football team and also was a member of the basketball and track and field teams. Jackson was rated a five-star recruit and the best collegiate prospect in Arizona as a senior and committed to play college football at the University of Southern California over offers from Washington and Arizona State.

College career
Jackson played in all 14 of the Trojans games as a true freshman, appearing as a reserve offensive lineman and playing special teams on the field goal unit where he played on both sides and blocked a kick against Colorado. He was named USC's starting left tackle going into his sophomore year and started all 12 of the team's games.

Jackson missed part of the summer practices going into his junior season due having surgery to donate bone marrow to his sister, who suffers from Diamond–Blackfan anemia. He returned to practice in early August and worked his way back to playing shape in time to begin the season as the Trojans starting left tackle. Jackson was named the Pac-12 Conference Offensive Lineman of the Week for Week 2 after his performance, which included blocking a 43-yard field goal attempt, in a 45–20 win over #23 Stanford on September 7, 2019. He was named first-team All-Pac-12 at the end of his junior year.  Following the 2019 season, Jackson announced that he would forgo his senior year and declared for the 2020 NFL Draft. Jackson played in all 39 of USC's games during his collegiate career with 25 starts.

Professional career

Jackson was drafted by the Miami Dolphins with the 18th pick in the first round of the 2020 NFL Draft. The Dolphins previously traded defensive back Minkah Fitzpatrick to the Pittsburgh Steelers to acquire the pick. Jackson made his NFL debut on September 13, 2020, in the season opener against the New England Patriots, starting at left tackle and playing all of the team's offensive snaps. Jackson was placed on injured reserve on October 9, 2020, after suffering a foot injury in Week 4 against the Seattle Seahawks. He was activated on November 7, 2020. He was placed on short-term injured reserve with an ankle injury on September 16, 2022.

Jackson entered the 2022 season as the Dolphins starting right tackle. He suffered an ankle injury in Week 1 and was placed on injured reserve on September 16, 2022. The Dolphins activated Jackson off of injured reserve on November 1. He was placed back on injured reserve on December 5.

Personal life
Jackson's grandfather, Melvin Jackson, also played offensive line at USC and played in the NFL for the Green Bay Packers. In the summer of 2019, Jackson donated bone marrow to his younger sister Autumn, who suffered from a rare form of anemia.

References

External links 
Miami Dolphins bio
 USC Trojans bio

1999 births
Living people
African-American players of American football
Players of American football from Phoenix, Arizona
American football offensive tackles
USC Trojans football players
Miami Dolphins players
21st-century African-American sportspeople